Torbeyevo (Tarbej) is an urban locality (a work settlement) and the administrative center of Torbeyevsky District in the Republic of Mordovia, Russia. As of the 2010 Census, its population was 9,373.

Administrative and municipal status
Within the framework of administrative divisions, Torbeyevo serves as the administrative center of Torbeyevsky District. As an administrative division, the work settlement of Torbeyevo, together with two rural localities, is incorporated within Torbeyevsky District as Torbeyevo Work Settlement. As a municipal division, Torbeyevo Work Settlement is incorporated within Torbeyevsky Municipal District as Torbeyevskoye Urban Settlement.

Climate
Torbeyevo has a humid continental climate (Köppen climate classification Dfb) with long, cold winters and warm summers. Some of the higher fluctuations in temperatures were recorded with seven straight days of temperatures  and higher compared to the previous year where the higher temperatures for the same period were, on average,  lower.

Notable people
It is the birthplace of Mikhail Devyatayev, who was born here in 1917.

References

Notes

Sources

Urban-type settlements in Mordovia
Torbeyevsky District